Raffaele Rocca (died 1514) was a Roman Catholic prelate who served as Bishop of Capri (1499–1514) and Bishop of Lucera (1497–1499).

Biography
On 17 April 1497, Raffaele Rocca was appointed Bishop of Lucera by Pope Alexander VI.
On 20 October 1499, he was transferred by Pope Alexander VI to the diocese of Capri.

He served as Bishop of Capri until his death in 1514.

References

External links and additional sources
 (for Chronology of Bishops)  
 (for Chronology of Bishops)  
 (for Chronology of Bishops) 
 (for Chronology of Bishops) 

15th-century Italian Roman Catholic bishops
16th-century Italian Roman Catholic bishops
Bishops appointed by Pope Alexander VI
1514 deaths